Terry Ryan (born September 10, 1952) is a Canadian former  professional ice hockey centre who played 76 games in the World Hockey Association for the Minnesota Fighting Saints.

Career statistics

External links
 

1952 births
Living people
People from Grand Falls-Windsor
Hamilton Red Wings (OHA) players
Ice hockey people from Newfoundland and Labrador
Kalamazoo Wings (1974–2000) players
Minnesota Fighting Saints players
Minnesota North Stars draft picks
Muskegon Mohawks players
Suncoast Suns (SHL) players
Winston-Salem Polar Twins (SHL) players
Canadian ice hockey centres